Gustavo Ramos (born 1993) is a Brazilian-American fine artist and oil painter. He initially gained recognition for painting a series of realistic portraits that went on to receive national and international awards. In 2020, he was a featured artist at the Springville Museum of Art, where one of his paintings was acquired for the museum's permanent collection. In 2022, he was selected as a winner of Royal Talens' The Year of Rembrandt Award, when his work was displayed in the Rijksmuseum.

Early life and education
Gustavo Ramos was born in 1993 in the country of Brazil. At the age of 15, he moved to Phoenix, Arizona. Not being fluent in the English language, he turned his attention to facial expressions and bodily gestures which precipitated his interest in portrait drawing and painting. He went on to study oil painting at Southern Virginia University where he earned his bachelor's degree in 2017. In that same year, he was the recipient of the John F. and Anna Lee Stacey Foundation Fine Art Award. He later attended the Florence Academy of Art.

Career
While Ramos was still in college, he created several self-portrait drawings as he studied the techniques of the old masters. In 2020, one of his self-portraits from this period was featured on the cover of The Artist's Magazine's "The Best of Drawing," earning him nationwide recognition. 

After finishing his studies in 2018, Ramos created a series of realistic portrait paintings with a focus on psychological narratives that would go on to be featured in publications like The Artist's Magazine, Fine Art Connoisseur, and Southwest Art which included him in "21 Under 31: Young Artists to Buy Now". In 2019, Ramos was accepted into the Art Renewal Center 13th Annual Salon, with his selected painting receiving a Staff Award and travelling to Sotheby's and the European Museum of Modern Art. In 2021, Ramos earned his place as a finalist in the Boynes Emerging Artist Award.

In 2022, Ramos was selected by Royal Talens as the artist to represent North America in The Year of Rembrandt, where he was awarded a trip to the Netherlands and the opportunity to display his work at the Rijksmuseum alongside the 6 other winning artists.

Ramos has most recently stepped into educational roles, including teaching workshops at the Scottsdale Artists School, and being a guest lecturer in the Illuminate event hosted by Artists Magazine.

References

21st-century painters
Living people
American realist painters
Realist painters
1993 births
Brazilian artists
Male artists